The Medical Association of Jamaica evolved from the British Medical Association Jamaica Branch which was constituted as the first overseas branch of the British Medical Association in 1877.  It has over 2000 members, including students.

The Association celebrated its Golden Jubilee as an independent organisation in June 2015.

References

External links
 Medical Association of Jamaica and Medical Association of Jamaica Insurance Fund

Medical associations based in Jamaica